Tingena oporaea is a species of moth in the family Oecophoridae. It is endemic to New Zealand and has been observed in Canterbury. The perferred habitat of this species is native beech forest at altitudes of 2500 ft however it has also been collected in tussock grassland. The larvae of this species are leaf litter feeders and the adults are on the wing in January and February.

Taxonomy

This species was first described by Edward Meyrick in 1883 and named Oecophora oporaea using specimens collected at Castle Hill in mid Canterbury at an altitude of 25000 ft in January. Meyrick went on to give a more detailed description in 1884. In 1915 Meyrick placed this species within the Borkhausenia genus as a synonym of Borkhausenia apertella. George Hudson discussed this species as a synonym of Borkhausenia apertella in his 1928 publication The butterflies and moths of New Zealand. In 1988 J. S. Dugdale reinstated this species and placed it in the genus Tingena. In doing so Dugdale pointed out that only the male lectotype and two female paralectotypes in Meyrick's series are T. oporaea. The others in Meyrick's series differ in their genitalia as well as their forewing colouration. The male lectotype is held at the Natural History Museum, London.

Description
Meyrick originally described this species as follows:

Meyrick's more detailed observation, given in 1884,  is as follows:

Meyrick states that this species can be distinguished from its similar appearing close relatives as it is larger, has a deeper yellow appearance to its forewings and has a yellow thorax.

Distribution
This species is endemic to New Zealand and is found in Canterbury.

Behaviour 
The adults of this species are on the wing in January and February.

Habitat and hosts
This species has been observed as being common amongst Nothofagus solandri. This species has also been collected in tussock grassland. The larvae of this species are leaf litter feeders.

References

Oecophoridae
Moths of New Zealand
Moths described in 1883
Endemic fauna of New Zealand
Taxa named by Edward Meyrick
Endemic moths of New Zealand